HMS E39 was a British E class submarine launched by Palmers, Jarrow in 1916 and was completed by Armstrong Whitworth, Newcastle upon Tyne. She was launched on 18 May 1916  and was commissioned in October 1916.

HMS E39 was sold on 13 October 1921, but in December 1922 she foundered in Watwick Bay at the entrance to Milford Haven, Pembrokeshire, while on tow to the shipbreakers.

Design
She was powered by two  Vickers eight-cylinder two-stroke diesel engines and two  electric motors.

E39 was armed with a 12-pounder  QF gun mounted forward of the conning tower. She had five 18 inch (450 mm) torpedo tubes, two in the bow, one either side amidships, and one in the stern; a total of 10 torpedoes were carried.

E-Class submarines had wireless systems with  power ratings; in some submarines, these were later upgraded to  systems by removing a midship torpedo tube. Their maximum design depth was  although in service some reached depths of below . Some submarines contained Fessenden oscillator systems.

Crew
Her complement was three officers and 28 men.

References

External links

 

British E-class submarines of the Royal Navy
Ships built on the River Tyne
1916 ships
World War I submarines of the United Kingdom
Royal Navy ship names